Maplewood Richmond Heights High School is a public high school in Maplewood, Missouri, United States.

History
Maplewood Richmond Heights School District was established in 1876 after St. Louis split from St. Louis County. The original high school building, designed by famed school architect William B. Ittner, built in 1929, is still standing and in use today.

As of 2022 the building has been undergoing major renovations and expansion.

Sports
In fall 2007, Maplewood's football team was undefeated in the regular season, losing to Blair Oaks, the defending state champions, in the state championship semifinal round with a score of 42–14. Maplewood's final record for the season was 12–1. 

In 2015, Maplewood Richmond Heights High School canceled its football program for the 2015–2016 season. Reasons included a lack of interest among the student body, injuries, and school size. Soccer replaced football for the school's homecoming game.

In the fall of 2015, the MRH Blue Devils soccer team broke the school's single season record in wins (20) after finishing the 2015–16 season 20–6.

Current sports are:
Baseball

Boys' basketball
 State championships: 2007, 2008
Girls' basketball
Volleyball
Cheerleading
Girls' soccer
Boys' soccer
Cross country
Track and field
Wrestling
 State championships:  1941, 1942, 1943, 1944, 1945, 1946, 1973
Girls' softball
Boys golf: grew 100% post Covid

Notable alumni
Tershawn Wharton, professional American football player and Super Bowl LVII champion for the Kansas City Chiefs.
Mark Christman, professional Major League Baseball player for the St. Louis Browns

References

External links

High schools in St. Louis County, Missouri
Public high schools in Missouri
Buildings and structures in St. Louis County, Missouri
1929 establishments in Missouri